Dušan Vukčević (Serbian Cyrillic: Душан Вукчевић; born November 14, 1975) is a retired Serbian professional basketball player who currently serves as an assistant coach for Peristeri of the Greek Basket League and the Basketball Champions League, under head coach Vassilis Spanoulis. At a height of 2.02 m tall, he played at the shooting guard and small forward positions. He also holds Greek citizenship, under the name Ntoussan Tsalikis-Vouktsevits (alternate spelling: Doussan Tsalikis-Vouktsevits).

Professional career
Vukčević grew up with the Bosna Sarajevo youth teams. He moved to Yugoslavia in 1993, to Crvena zvezda, where he played two years. After that he moved to Greece, where he first played for Apollon Patras, and then Olympiacos, where he played four years and got a Greek passport. In the 2001–02 season, he went to Spain to play for Real Madrid, and a year after that, he went to Montepaschi Siena, where he won the first Italian League championship of the club's history. In 2005, he played for Ülkerspor. He later played in Italy for Olimpia Milano, Virtus Bologna, Basket Rimini, and Scaligera Verona, where he last played in the 2011–12 season.

National team career
Vukčević was a member of the Serbia and Montenegro national team at the FIBA EuroBasket 2003 in Sweden. Over seven tournament games, he averaged 4.0 points, 1.0 rebound and 0.3 assists per game.

Sportscasting career
Since he has Greek citizenship, and speaks Greek fluently, after his playing pro career ended, Vukčević became a basketball game commentator on Greek TV.

Coaching career
Vukčević began working as a basketball coach in 2022, when he joined the Greek Basket League club Peristeri. He was signed to work for the club as an assistant coach, under the team's head coach, Vassilis Spanoulis.

Personal life 
Vukčević is married to Swedish businesswoman Jade Cicak. They have two sons. Their older son, Tristan (born 2003), is a professional basketball player for Partizan NIS.

References

External links
 Euroleague.net profile 
 Eurobasket.com profile
 Italian League profile
 Spanish League profile

1975 births
Living people
Apollon Patras B.C. players
Basketball players from Sarajevo
Basket Rimini Crabs players
Bosnia and Herzegovina expatriate basketball people in Serbia
Greek basketball coaches
Greek men's basketball players
Greek people of Bosnia and Herzegovina descent
Greek people of Serbian descent
KK Crvena zvezda players
Liga ACB players
Mens Sana Basket players
Naturalized citizens of Greece
Olympiacos B.C. players
Olimpia Milano players
Real Madrid Baloncesto players
Scaligera Basket Verona players
Serbian basketball coaches
Serbian expatriate basketball people in Greece
Serbian expatriate basketball people in Italy
Serbian expatriate basketball people in Spain
Serbian expatriate basketball people in Turkey
Serbian men's basketball players
Serbs of Bosnia and Herzegovina
Shooting guards
Small forwards
Ülker G.S.K. basketball players
Virtus Bologna players